Leena Uotila (born 16 June 1947) is a Finnish actress. She has appeared in more than one hundred films since 1971.

Early life 

On June 16, 1947, Uotila was born as Leena Marjatta Uotila in Helsinki, Finland.

Career

Filmography

Film

Television

References

External links 
 

1947 births
Living people
Actresses from Helsinki
Finnish film actresses